Thomas Blanchard (born 16 July 1980) is a French actor. He has appeared in more than thirty films since 1997.

Selected filmography

References

External links 

1980 births
Living people
French male film actors